was a Japanese film actor. He appeared in more than one hundred films from 1953 to 2008.

Filmography

Awards

References

External links
 

1934 births
2012 deaths
Actors from Saga Prefecture
Japanese male film actors
Japanese male television actors
20th-century Japanese male actors
21st-century Japanese male actors